Betty Willis may refer to:

Betty Willis (artist) (1923–2015), American artist and graphic designer
Betty Willis (singer) (1941–2018), American soul singer